Danganronpa 3 may refer to:

 Danganronpa 3: The End of Hope's Peak High School, an anime series and direct sequel to Danganronpa 2: Goodbye Despair.
 Danganronpa V3: Killing Harmony, a video game and the third main entry in the franchise, which begins a new storyline for the series.